D7, D07, D.VII, D VII, D.7 or D-7 may refer to:

Arts and entertainment
 D7, a chord (music) 
 D7, a note in the whistle register
 D-7 (Wipers song), a song by the Wipers from the 1980 album Is This Real?
 Covered by Nirvana on the 1992 album Hormoaning
 D-7, a fictional Star Trek Klingon starship class
 Determined 7, a group of fictional characters based off of Undertale in a Roblox game called Undertale 3D Boss Battles.

Businesses and organisations
 Dinar Líneas Aéreas (1992–2002), IATA airline designator D7	
 AirAsia X, IATA airline designator D7
 Digital 7, a group of national governments seeking to strengthen the digital economy

Places
 D7 road (Croatia), a state road
 D7 motorway (Czech Republic)
 A Dublin postal district

Science, technology and mathematics

Military
D.VII aircraft (disambiguation), a number of aircraft
Fokker D.VII, a German World War I fighter aircraft 
 HMS Patroller (D07), a 1943 British Royal Navy escort aircraft carrier
 HMS D7, a Royal Navy submarine launched in 1911

Transportation and vehicles
 Bavarian D VII, an 1880 German steam locomotive model
 Caterpillar D7, a 1938 medium bulldozer
 Dewoitine D.7, a 1920s French sport plane
 Pennsylvania Railroad class D7, a steam locomotive
 LNER Class D7, a class of British steam locomotives 
 ATS D7, a Formula One racing car 
D7 Super, a BSA Bantam motorcycle

Other
 ATC code D07, Corticosteroids, dermatological preparations, a subgroup of the Anatomical Therapeutic Chemical Classification System
 D7 polytope, in 7-dimensional geometry
 d7, a d electron count

See also 
 7D (disambiguation)